João Manuel Loureiro dos Santos, known as João Manuel (born 31 August 1967; died 18 May 2005 of multiple sclerosis) was a Portuguese football player.

Club career
He made his professional debut in the Primeira Liga for Académico de Viseu on 28 August 1988 as a starter in a 0–0 draw against Marítimo. Over his career, he played 255 games on the top level of Portuguese football, most of them with União de Leiria, he also played in the UEFA Europa League and UEFA Intertoto Cup with the club.

International
He was called up to the Portugal national football team several times in 1996 and 1997, but stayed on the bench in each game he was on the roster.

References

1967 births
Portuguese footballers
Académico de Viseu F.C. players
Primeira Liga players
Liga Portugal 2 players
Associação Académica de Coimbra – O.A.F. players
U.D. Leiria players
Moreirense F.C. players
2005 deaths
Neurological disease deaths in Portugal
Deaths from multiple sclerosis
Association football midfielders
Sportspeople from Viseu District